The 1936 Volta a Catalunya was the 18th edition of the Volta a Catalunya cycle race and was held from 13 June to 21 June 1936. The race started and finished in Barcelona. The race was won by Mariano Cañardo.

Route and stages

General classification

References

1936
Volta
1936 in Spanish road cycling
June 1936 sports events